The William Grubb Farm, also known as Conway and Brook Manor, is located near Charles Town, West Virginia.  Built c. 1763 by William Grubb Jr., the house is a "stone-ender," with stone masonry at the gable ends of the house and log construction on the long sides, now covered with clapboards.  The complex includes the house, a well course (1920), a corn crib (c. 1850), a barn (c. 1850), and a Quaker burial ground (c. 1759 and onwards).

History
In October 1734, Emanuel Grubb and John Grubb, Jr., the two oldest sons of John Grubb of Brandywine Hundred, Delaware, had  surveyed along the Bullskin Creek near Charles Town.  While it is unlikely that either Emanuel or John, Jr. ever traveled to the area, the next year, Emanuel's son John and John Grubb, Jr.'s son, William posted a 100-pound bond to secure the title, listed as Tract 76, Map 3.  William returned to Delaware, and Emanuel's sons John, James, Frances, Benjamin and Emanuel Jr. settled in the area where they shipped hides back to the family's tannery in Delaware.  In 1742, the family purchased two additional tracts, yielding  and nine years later purchased a further .

At the time, this was a tough frontier region and Benjamin Grubb became one of its colorful figures.  He and his associate David Morgan were once hauled before the magistrate after they took on all comers in a bar room brawl.  However, by 1864 Benjamin was the last member of Emanuel Grubb's family in the area when he sold the remainder of Emanuel's interest and relocated to North Carolina.

When John Grubb, Jr. died in 1758, his interest in the Bullskin Creek property was inherited by his son Adam, a Pennsylvania shipwright who had no use for the tract.  He leased the property to his older brother William Grubb (1713–1775), a Delaware farmer who had traveled to the Bullskin area in the mid-1730s to represent his father when the land was first acquired.  William was a leader in the Chichester, Pennsylvania Quaker Meeting and the church was interested in establishing a settlement in the Charles Town area.  On September 1, 1762, William and his brother, Samuel (another Delaware Quaker farmer) received an additional  from Lord Fairfax.

With the war now over, it became reasonably safe to settle in the region, and William's son, William Grubb, Jr. (1740 - c. 1810) relocated to the area from Delaware with his new bride, Susanna (probably Kerlin).  William and Susannah ultimately inherited all of the family's Bullskin lands where they raised eight children.  During the Revolution, William supplied over 100 barrels of whisky per month to his neighbor, George Washington.  By 1800 a mill had been built, which operated until 1935.  The Bullskin Run Quaker Meeting House was also on the property, but does not survive.  When William, Jr. died, the property was inherited by William Grubb III (c. 1779 - c. 1858) who moved to Ohio in 1814 and sold the property to his sister Rebecca and her husband, John Haines.  The house was expanded in 1880 by Warren Eby.

References

Houses on the National Register of Historic Places in West Virginia
Houses in Jefferson County, West Virginia
Georgian architecture in West Virginia
Houses completed in 1763
Farms on the National Register of Historic Places in West Virginia
National Register of Historic Places in Jefferson County, West Virginia
Historic districts in Jefferson County, West Virginia
Colonial architecture in West Virginia
Historic districts on the National Register of Historic Places in West Virginia
Log buildings and structures on the National Register of Historic Places in West Virginia
Quakerism in West Virginia